USCGC Richard Etheridge is the second of the United States Coast Guard's  cutters.  
Richard Etheridge was launched in August 2011.

The vessel was officially delivered to the Coast Guard on May 26, 2012, at Key West, Florida, and was commissioned into service in Port Everglades, Florida, on August 3, 2012.

Like the other ships of her class, Richard Etheridge is named after an enlisted member of the Coast Guard.

Operational history

On March 18, 2014, Richard Etheridge landed  of illicit drugs captured as part of Operation Martillo.

Namesake

Richard Etheridge is named after Keeper Richard Etheridge of the U.S. Life-Saving Service, the first African-American to command a life-saving station. Etheridge led the Pea Island Lifesaving Station crew of six in a daring rescue operation that saved the entire crew of the schooner E.S. Newman, which had become grounded in a treacherous storm in 1896.

Design
The Sentinel-class cutters were designed to replace the shorter  Island-class patrol boats. Richard Etheridge is with a remote-control 25 mm Bushmaster autocannon and four, crew-served M2HB .50-caliber machine guns. It has a bow thruster for maneuvering in crowded anchorages and channels. It also has small underwater fins for coping with the rolling and pitching caused by large waves. It has a complement of twenty-two crew members. Like the Marine Protector class, and the cancelled extended Island-class cutters, the Sentinel-class cutters deploy the Short Range Prosecutor rigid-hulled inflatable (SRP or RHIB) in rescues and interceptions.

References 

Sentinel-class cutters
2011 ships
Ships of the United States Coast Guard
Ships built in Lockport, Louisiana